The Coleman Vision Tennis Championships is a tournament for professional female tennis players played on outdoor hard courts. The event is classified as a $80,000 ITF Women's Circuit tournament. It has been held in Albuquerque, New Mexico, United States, since 1998.

Past finals

Singles

Doubles

External links 

 
 ITF search

 
ITF Women's World Tennis Tour
Hard court tennis tournaments in the United States
Sports in Albuquerque, New Mexico
Recurring sporting events established in 1998
Events in Albuquerque, New Mexico